HKK may refer to:
 Armenian Communist Party
 Hokitika Airport, in New Zealand
 Hunjara language, spoken in Papua New Guinea